Australia is scheduled to compete at the 2024 Summer Olympics in Paris from 26 July to 11 August 2024. Australian athletes have appeared in every Summer Olympic Games of the modern era, alongside France, Great Britain, Greece, and Switzerland. As Brisbane will stage the 2032 Summer Olympics, Australia and the United States, the next nation to host the 2028 Summer Olympics in Los Angeles, will march before the homebound French team enters Place du Trocadéro during the parade of nations segment of the opening ceremony.

Competitors
The following is the list of number of competitors in the Games.

Athletics

Australian track and field athletes achieved the entry standards for Paris 2024, either by passing the direct qualifying mark (or time for track and road races) or by world ranking, in the following events (a maximum of 3 athletes each):

Track and road events
Men

Women

Equestrian

Australia fielded a squad of three equestrian riders into the team dressage competition as the top-ranked nation from Southeast Asia and Oceania, vying for qualification, at the 2022 FEI World Championships in Herning, Denmark.

Dressage

Qualification Legend: Q = Qualified for the final based on position in group; q = Qualified for the final based on overall position

Shooting

Australian shooters achieved quota places for the following events based on their results at the 2022 and 2023 ISSF World Championships, 2023 and 2024 Oceania Championships, and 2024 ISSF World Olympic Qualification Tournament, if they obtained a minimum qualifying score (MQS) from 14 August 2022 to 9 June 2024.

References

Nations at the 2024 Summer Olympics
2024
2024 in Australian sport